The 2015 World RX of Hockenheim was the 2nd round of the second season of the FIA World Rallycross Championship. The event was held at the Hockenheimring in Hockenheim, Baden-Württemberg, alongside the Deutsche Tourenwagen Masters.

Heats

Semi-finals

Semi-final 1

Semi-final 2

Final

Championship standings after the event

References

External links

|- style="text-align:center"
|width="35%"|Previous race:2015 World RX of Portugal
|width="30%"|FIA World Rallycross Championship2015 season
|width="35%"|Next race:2015 World RX of Belgium
|- style="text-align:center"
|width="35%"|Previous race:None
|width="30%"|World RX of Hockenheim
|width="35%"|Next race:2016 World RX of Hockenheim
|- style="text-align:center"

Hockenheim
World RX, Hockenheim